The Robert Burns Memorial is an outdoor memorial and statue of Scottish poet Robert Burns, located in Stanley Park in Vancouver, British Columbia, Canada.

Description
Located at the southern approach to the park near Coal Harbour, upon a tall light-coloured stone plinth, a standing Robert Burns facing the south towards the southern entrance.  A plaque appears on the front with his name, followed clockwise of reliefs of scenes from his poems, To a Mountain Daisy (1786), The Cotter's Saturday Night (1785), and Tam O'Shanter (1790).

History
The sculpture was dedicated on August 25, 1928, becoming the first statue erected in Vancouver.

See also

 1928 in art
 List of Robert Burns memorials

References

External links
 

1928 establishments in Canada
1928 sculptures
Cultural depictions of Robert Burns
Monuments and memorials in Vancouver
Outdoor sculptures in Vancouver
Sculptures of men in Canada
Statues in Canada
Burns